German submarine U-721 was a Type VIIC U-boat of Nazi Germany's Kriegsmarine during World War II. The submarine was laid down on 16 November 1942 at the H. C. Stülcken Sohn yard at Hamburg, launched on 23 July 1943, and commissioned on 8 November 1943 under the command of Oberleutnant zur See Otto Wollschläger.

Design
German Type VIIC submarines were preceded by the shorter Type VIIB submarines. U-721 had a displacement of  when at the surface and  while submerged. She had two shafts and two  propellers.

U-721 was fitted with five  torpedo tubes (four fitted at the bow and one at the stern), fourteen torpedoes, one  SK C/35 naval gun, 220 rounds, and two twin  C/30 anti-aircraft guns. The boat had a complement of between forty-four and sixty.

Fate
The final action of the submarine was during Operation Hannibal when it evacuated some 100 civilians and wounded soldiers. It was scuttled on 5 May 1945 in Geltinger Bucht as part of Operation Regenbogen and later raised and broken up for scrap.

References

Bibliography

External links

World War II submarines of Germany
German Type VIIC submarines
1943 ships
Ships built in Hamburg
U-boats commissioned in 1943
Operation Regenbogen (U-boat)
Maritime incidents in May 1945